Scott Direen (born 20 October 1972) is a former Australian rules footballer who played with the Sydney Swans in the Australian Football League (AFL).

Drafted from Tasmanian club New Norfolk, Direen was a defender during his time in Sydney. He played 19 of a possible 22 games in 1995, the most appearances he made in a season. In 1996 he added another 13 games but was not selected in the grand final team, or in any of the finals. He had been badly injured that year in a game against Richmond, suffering spinal concussion.

Direen finished his career in South Australia, playing 114 games for Norwood, between 1998 and 2004. He won their best and fairest award in 2000.

References

External links
 
 

1972 births
Living people
Australian rules footballers from Tasmania
Sydney Swans players
Norwood Football Club players
New Norfolk Football Club players